Pavilion is a Canadian travel documentary television series which aired on CBC Television in 1967.

Premise
Lloyd Robertson presented film features on the various nations which hosted pavilions at Expo 67 in Montreal such as Australia, Austria, Denmark, Finland, France, Iceland, Israel, Japan, Mauritius, the Netherlands, Norway, Sweden, Tanzania, the United Kingdom, the United States and West Germany.

Scheduling
This half-hour series was broadcast on CBC Fridays at 5:30 p.m. (Eastern) from 7 July to 29 September 1967.

See also
Expo This Week, another CBC TV series on Expo 67

References

External links
 

CBC Television original programming
1967 Canadian television series debuts
1967 Canadian television series endings
Expo 67